This is a list of diplomatic missions in Djibouti. The capital Djibouti currently hosts 24 embassies.

Embassies in Djibouti

Non-resident embassies
In Addis Ababa except as noted
 
 (Nairobi)

 (Cairo)
 (Riyadh)

 (Nairobi)
 (Abu Dhabi)
 (Cairo)

 (Cairo)

 (Nairobi)

 (Riyadh)
 (Riyadh) 
 (Riyadh)
 (New Delhi)
 (Riyadh)
 (Muscat) 

 (Cairo)
 (Cairo)

 (Nairobi)
 (Cairo)
  

 (Nairobi)

 (Cairo)

 (Riyadh)
 (Sana'a)
 (Geneva)

 (Tripoli)

Other posts in Djibouti
 European Union (Delegation)
 (Representative Office)

See also
Foreign relations of Djibouti
List of diplomatic missions of Djibouti

References

Djibouti
Diplomatic missions